The 1914 Copa Ibarguren was the 2nd. edition of this National cup of Argentina. It was played by the champions of both leagues, Primera División and Liga Rosarina de Football crowned during 1914.

Racing (Primera División champion) faced Rosario Central (Liga Rosarina champion) at the stadium of Club Atlético Estudiantes located on Alvear Avenue (current Avenida del Libertador) and Oro in Palermo, on December 6, 1914. Racing won 3–1 with goal by striker Alberto Marcovecchio.

Qualified teams 

Note

Match details

References

i
i
1914 in Argentine football
1914 in South American football
Football in Buenos Aires